Márcio Faraco is a Brazilian-born singer, composer, producer and guitar player. After many years of living and working in Brazil, he decided to leave the country for Paris, France.

Discography
Brasil Pass (1995)
Ciranda (2000)
Interior (2002)
Com Tradição (2005)
Invento (2007)
Um Rio (2009)
O Tempo (2011)
Cajueiro (2014)
L'Electricien De La Ville Lumiere (2021)
Márcio Faraco performed on June 23, 2016 at the Gibraltar World Music Festival in St. Michael's Cave.

References

External links
 Márcio's official site

People from Alegrete
20th-century Brazilian male singers
20th-century Brazilian singers
Brazilian composers
21st-century Brazilian male singers
21st-century Brazilian singers
Brazilian male guitarists
Living people
1963 births